"Wandered to LA" is a song by American rapper and singer Juice Wrld and Canadian singer Justin Bieber. It was released Interscope Records and Grade A Productions as the second single from the former's fourth studio album, Fighting Demons, on December 3, 2021. Juice and Bieber wrote the song with producers Louis Bell and Harv alongside Omer Fedi. Juice first previewed the song in September 2018 before Bieber was added to the song.

Composition and lyrics
"Wandered to LA" is a "glossy pop" song that is set in the key of C major with a tempo of 135 beats per minute. Writing for GQ, Grant Rindner felt that the song was "true to the artist Juice was becoming". In the chorus and his verse, Juice details his love for taking drugs. Bieber details his effort to make a relationship work in his verse.

Release and promotion
On December 2, 2021, what would have been Juice's 23rd birthday, his team announced the single and its imminent release along with Bieber being added as the co-lead artist. A trailer video was also released on the same day, which details Juice and Bieber separately talking about their respective previous drug addictions and advise their fans to speak out about loneliness.

Critical reception
Writing for Variety, A.D. Amorosi praised Bieber's verse on "Wandered to LA" and said that it was one of his favorites on Fighting Demons, writing that 
"the gently jiving and soulful track is there to support Juice's jazziest-ever vocal line, with Bieber offering up a similarly slippery sing-song-iness", adding that "as a guest shot, Bieber and Juice sound as if they're playing off one another – the very point of what a dynamic feature should sound like, whether or not its host is living or deceased". Kyann-Sian Williams of NME opined that over the "breezy guitar strums" of the song, the two artists "detail their relationships", acknowledged Juice rapping about "dark themes" in his verse ("Maybe it's because the lies, they fill her up / You see the ghost on her front porch"), but did not agree with Bieber's contribution to the song as the "lines and melodies" in his verse, "although sweet, don't fit in so well with such gothic tone of the song" (“Reminiscing about the days you broke my heart / Thankful that we worked it out – we come so far").

Charts

Release history

References

2021 singles
2021 songs
Juice Wrld songs
Justin Bieber songs
Song recordings produced by Harv
Song recordings produced by Louis Bell
Songs written by Harv
Songs written by Juice Wrld
Songs written by Justin Bieber
Songs written by Louis Bell
Songs written by Omer Fedi